Amara interstitialis is a species of seed-eating ground beetle in the family Carabidae. It is found in Europe and Northern Asia (excluding China) and North America.

References

Further reading

 

interstitialis
Articles created by Qbugbot
Beetles described in 1828